Henry Grey, 6th Earl of Kent (1541 – 31 January 1615) was an English peer.

He was a son of Henry Grey (1520–1545) and Margaret St. John and grandson of Henry Grey, 4th Earl of Kent. He was a younger brother of Reginald Grey, 5th Earl of Kent and an older brother of Charles Grey, 7th Earl of Kent.

He served as Lord Lieutenant of Bedfordshire from 1586 to his death. In 1587 he was one of the official witnesses at the execution of Mary, Queen of Scots.

He was married to Mary Cotton, daughter of Sir George Cotton and Mary Onley. There were no known children from the marriage; he was thus succeeded by his younger brother, Charles.

Sources
The Complete Peerage

External links
A Grey family pedigree

1541 births
1615 deaths
Earls of Kent (1465 creation)
Lord-Lieutenants of Bedfordshire
Henry
16th-century English nobility
17th-century English nobility
Burials at the de Grey Mausoleum (Flitton)
Barons Grey of Ruthin